Olivier Moncelet (born 5 December 1970 in Nantes) is a French rower.

References 
 
 

1970 births
Living people
French male rowers
Sportspeople from Nantes
Rowers at the 1996 Summer Olympics
Olympic silver medalists for France
Olympic rowers of France
Olympic medalists in rowing
World Rowing Championships medalists for France
Medalists at the 1996 Summer Olympics
20th-century French people